Hans Stam (April 2, 1919 in Cheribon, Dutch East Indies – June 25, 1996 in The Hague) was a Dutch water polo player who competed in the 1948 Summer Olympics.

He was part of the Dutch team which won the bronze medal. He played five matches.

See also
 List of Olympic medalists in water polo (men)

External links
 

1919 births
1996 deaths
Dutch male water polo players
Olympic bronze medalists for the Netherlands in water polo
Water polo players at the 1948 Summer Olympics
Medalists at the 1948 Summer Olympics
People from Cirebon
Dutch people of the Dutch East Indies
20th-century Dutch people
20th-century Dutch East Indies people